Cyriacus of Jerusalem (also called Judas Cyriacus; died 133) was a bishop of Jerusalem who died during a riot in 133 AD. He is often misidentified with Cyriacus of Ancona (d. 360).

References 

Year of birth missing
133 deaths
2nd-century bishops of Jerusalem